U.S. Silver & Gold Inc. was a mining company based in Wallace, Idaho near Coeur d'Alene, Idaho. The chairman of the company was Bobby E. Cooper, the CEO was Tom Parker.

In 2006 USSC purchased the Coeur, Caladay, and Galena mines from Coeur d'Alene Mines Corporation “Coeur” (NYSE:CDE). The property contains two mines and one exploration shaft.

History of the district 

The Coeur d’Alene Mining District is one of the preeminent silver, lead and zinc producing areas in the world, located near the base of the panhandle of northern Idaho, and has produced over 1 billion ounces of silver.

Galena mine 

The Galena mine has a long history dating back to 1887. However, recent mining began in 1953 by ASARCO, in an effort to explore and exploit outcrops of silver-lead ore.  At that time a shaft was sunk to the 3000 level (3000 feet below the shaft collar) and lateral or level drifts were excavated on the 2800 and 3000 levels.  The level drifts accessed down dip projections of the silver-lead ore from above.   The development on these levels included, drifting on ore and excavation of raises between the 2800 and 3000 levels and some diamond drilling.  The “lead ore” was ready for production in 1953 when a drift crew on the east end of the 3000 level exposed a wide siderite-tetrahedrite-chalcopyrite vein that assayed over 50 ounces per ton silver.  ASARCO abandoned the silver-lead development and focused on this new high grade discovery.  The new discovery was called the Silver vein and has been the largest vein found at the Galena to date with estimated production of over 100 million ounces of silver at averages grades of over 20 ounces per ton.   From 1953 until present, all exploration, development and production has been focused on the tetrahedrite silver-copper ores.

Because ASARCO focused its efforts in 1953 on the silver-copper veins no systematic exploration program was ever conducted at the Galena for silver-lead ore until USSC took over in 2006. Total production since 1953 is over 10 million pounds of silver, 116 million pounds of copper and 22.0 million pounds of lead from 7.0 million tons of ore.  Average grade of the silver-copper ore has been 22.89 ounces per ton of silver and 0.83% copper.  Average grade of the silver-lead ore has been 8.18 ounces silver and 8.8% lead per ton of ore.  The mine is currently producing silver-copper ore at a rate of approximately 625 tons per day.  Ore grades are approximately 24.0 ounces per ton silver and 0.76% copper.

The present day Galena Mine is an underground silver-copper mine and is served by two vertical shafts. The Galena shaft primarily provides utility access for water, electrical power and sand backfill for underground operations down to the 5,200 level. The Galena mine also has an operating 1,100 ton per day flotation mill, maintenance shop, carpenters shop office and dry facilities. The mine utilizes conventional and mechanized cut and fill mining methods with sand backfill to extract ore from the high grade silver-copper vein deposits that constitute the majority of the ore reserves. Silver and copper are recovered by a flotation mill that produces a silver rich concentrate which is sold to third-party smelters in Canada. 
Waste material from the milling process is deposited in a tailings pond located approximately two miles from the mine site. The tailings containment pond, which is expanded on an as needed basis, has capacity for approximately eight additional years at current production rates.

Coeur Mine 

The Coeur Mine is an underground silver mine located adjacent to the Galena Mine.  The Coeur Mine operated until mid-1998 when the property was placed on care and maintenance. There has been no mining activity at the Coeur mine since that time. The Coeur Mine is connected to the Galena Mine, which allows future discoveries at either mine to be developed and processed at either facility. This connection is currently being utilized to provide ventilation and secondary access to the Galena Mine.

The Coeur mine produced continuously from 1969 through 1991 and again from 1996 through 1997.  The total production was 39 million ounces of silver and 33 million pounds of copper from 2.4 million tons of ore.  Average ore grades were 16.0 ounces per ton silver and 0.68% copper.

The Coeur mine also has a 600 ton per day flotation mill, maintenance shop, office and dry facility. The Coeur Mill was put back into production in October, 2007 to process lead-silver ores from the Galena Mine. The concentrates produced are shipped to Trail, British Columbia and processed by Teck-Cominco.

Caladay property 

The Caladay property adjoins the Galena Mine. Similar geologic conditions which exist at the Galena mine extend into Caladay below the level of the current workings. The facilities are used to benefit the Galena Mine operations by providing additional ventilation.

Mineralization 

Ore deposits of the Coeur d’Alene Mining District and USSC are hosted by slightly metamorphosed Precambrian sedimentary rocks of the Belt Supergroup. Belt strata are composed primarily of fine-grained quartz and original clay (now metamorphosed to fine-grained white mica, or sericite). Although the composition of these metasediments varies widely, three major rock types are generally recognized.  These rock type definitions were first applied in the district to the Revett Formation (White and Wilson, 1982) but have since been used in describing other Belt formations as well.  The rock types are; vitreous quartzite, sericitic quartzite, and siltite-argillite.

The ore bodies at USSC's property occur as steeply dipping fissure filling veins.  The veins cut through the rocks of the Revett Formation and are found along major fracture systems and major faults.  The veins generally strike east west and northeast southwest and range in thickness from a few inches to over fifteen feet. Two different ore bearing sulfide assemblages are found at the Galena, a silver-copper ore and a silver-lead ore. Grades of the silver-copper veins range from a few ounces of silver to over a thousand ounces of silver per ton and since 1953 have averaged over 22 ounces per ton.  Copper grades range from tenths of a percent to over two percent and since 1953 have averaged 0.83 percent per ton.  Grades of the silver-lead ores average approximately 13 ounces of silver and 16% lead per ton.

The cross-section shows the Revett Formation in the core of the Big Creek anticline and the position of the productive veins discovered to date on the north limb of the anticline. The beds dip steeply to the north and the faults dip steeply to the south.

Exploration targeting 

Historic exploration at the Galena and Coeur mines was carried out by following the “trend” of the veins with drifting and diamond drilling. This method was successful but it is believed that it did not allow for recognition of the larger picture of the geologic interplay of faults, veins, and stratigraphy. One obvious effect of the trend based exploration was that the underground workings at the Galena mine were developed in NW-SE direction from the central shafts. The directional development has caused large prospective areas of the Galena and Coeur mines to remain unexplored. One such area is the hanging wall of the Polaris fault. The single largest and most productive vein in the Galena and Coeur mines is the Galena’s silver vein which has produced over 25 million ounces of silver and is located in the hanging wall of the Polaris fault. The trend-based exploration caused the workings to be developed in northwesterly trend because of numerous secondary ore vein bearing veins in the footwall of the silver vein.

Structural control on vein mineralization has long been recognized in the Coeur d’Alene District.  However, using these observations in developing predictive exploration models has proven difficult.  With the advent of 3-D modeling software the integration of structure, stratigraphy and geochemistry into a three-dimensional model for use in exploration has been facilitated and is being carried out at Coeur Silver Valley.

The basis of the current structural work at the Galena is that the emplacement of the vein arrays is structurally controlled.  There are secondary controls imposed by stratigraphy and geochemistry but structure is considered the most dominant because the movement of fluid required for vein and mineral precipitation requires the presence of active structures.  A geometric model of the Coeur-Galena was constructed in Datamine Studio software, which has allowed for examination of the faults and veins and their relationships to one another.

Merger with RX Gold & Silver 

On June 7, 2012, U.S.Silver Corporation and RX Gold & Silver announced the signing of a definitive agreement to merge the two companies and form U.S. Silver & Gold. The highlights of the agreement included     
 U.S. Silver shareholders to receive 0.670 U.S. Silver & Gold shares per U.S. Silver share, resulting in their effective ownership of approximately 70% of the combined company
 RX Gold shareholders to receive 0.109 U.S. Silver & Gold shares per RX Gold share, resulting in their effective ownership of approximately 30% of the combined company
 Two 100% owned U.S. based precious metal operations that deliver immediate cash and one silver re-development asset
 Combined production base of 2.7 million ounces of silver and 26,5001 ounces of gold
 Opportunities for significant resource growth, brownfield development and operational and head office synergies
 Meaningful organic exploration potential at Drumlummon and Silver Valley area
 Geographic concentration of assets that allows for near term focus on improving mine planning and execution of cost reduction strategies
 Proven board of directors and management team with significant executive experience in senior precious metals companies and the capability to deliver results in tough market conditions
 Improved liquidity and capital markets profile, US$25 million in cash and capital markets relationships that position the larger, combined company for further growth through opportunistic and accretive acquisitions
 Unanimous recommendations from the boards of both companies that shareholders vote for the transaction.  The board and senior management of each company have agreed to vote in favour of the transaction.  In addition, Sprott Asset Management LP ("Sprott") has signed a lock-up agreement supporting the transaction. Sprott is the largest shareholder of both companies and currently holds approximately 14% of U.S. Silver shares and 8% of RX Gold shares 
 A key objective of the combined company will be to exceed 5.0 million ounces of silver production at significantly lower cash costs by 2014.

On July 25, 2012, Hecla Mining Company announced its intention to make an all-cash offer to acquire all of the outstanding common shares of U.S. Silver for C$1.80 per share and all of the outstanding common share purchase warrants of U.S. Silver for C$0.205 per warrant.

On July 30, 2012, U.S. Silver’s Board of Directors unanimously recommended that U.S. Silver shareholders reject the unsolicited cash offer from Hecla Mining and recommended that U.S. Silver instead vote their U.S. Silver shares in favour of the proposed combination transaction with RX Gold & Silver Inc.

On August 7, 2012, during the special meeting of shareholders, U.S. Silver shareholders approved the proposed transaction with RX Gold. Five days later, on August 13, 2012, U.S. Silver and RX Gold finalized their merger.

On August 15, 2012, the newly created company U.S. Silver & Gold began trading on the Toronto Stock Exchange under the symbol “USA” and on August 29, 2012, the Company began trading on the OTCQX International under the symbol “USGIF”.

See also
 Hard rock mining

External links
 US Silver

Mining companies of the United States
Silver mining companies of the United States